Luz Jiménez or Luciana (born Julia Jiménez González; 1897–1965) was an indigenous Mexican model and Nahuatl-language storyteller and linguistic informant from Milpa Alta, D.F.

As a young woman she witnessed the Mexican Revolution, and was present when Emiliano Zapata and his revolutionary army entered Milpa Alta in 1911. Her eyewitness account is one of the only testimonies of Emiliano Zapata speaking Nahuatl. In 1916 most of her male relatives were killed in a massacre by the Carrancistas.

In the 1930s she served as a linguistic informant to linguists working to document the Nahuatl language. Among others she worked with Benjamin Lee Whorf who credits her in his description of Milpa Alta Nahuatl. She also worked as a model for artist Diego Rivera and her portrait can be seen in at least three of his murals, one of them the famous Tlatelolco market scene.

In 1942 she started work as a model at the Escuela Nacional de Pintura, Escultura y Grabado "La Esmeralda" (National School of Painting, Sculpture and Printmaking) in Frida Kahlo's classes.

In her old age she told her life's story to anthropologist Fernando Horcasitas who published it with the title "Life and Death in Milpa Alta".

As the godparents of her daughter Concha, Jean Charlot and Anita Brenner were her compadres. Luz died in 1965 after being hit by a car in Mexico City.

Works in which Jiménez appears
Jiménez as a model appears inter alia in the following works:
 Fuente de los Cántaros ("Fountain of the Jugs", by José María Fernández Urbina) in Parque México, Condesa, Mexico City
 Diego Rivera:
La Creación, (1922), San Ildefonso College, then the National Preparatory School
La molendera (1926)
 Portrait by photographers Edward Weston and Tina Modotti (1940)
 Drawing of Luz Jiménez (April 1924) by Jean Charlot

Tribute

On 28 January 2023, Google Doodle celebrated Luz Jiménez’s 126th Birthday.

References

Sources
 English original. Published in Spanish as:

External links 
Itzcuintli blog with photos of Luz Jimenez
 Meet Doña Luz Jiménez, the forgotten indigenous woman at the heart of Mexico’s cultural revolution

1897 births
1965 deaths
Road incident deaths in Mexico
Indigenous Mexicans
Nahua people
Translators from Nahuatl
Mexican artists' models
Mexican Mesoamericanists
Women Mesoamericanists
20th-century Mesoamericanists
20th-century translators
Pedestrian road incident deaths
Indigenous Mexican women